Miscera desmotoma is a moth in the family Brachodidae. It was described by Oswald Bertram Lower in 1896. It is found in Australia.

References

Brachodidae
Moths described in 1896